Shurbeyg (also Romanized as Shūrbeyg; also known as Jalālābād and Shūrbek) is a village in Mian Rokh Rural District, Jolgeh Rokh District, Torbat-e Heydarieh County, Razavi Khorasan Province, Iran. At the 2006 census, its population was 75, in 20 families.

References 

Populated places in Torbat-e Heydarieh County